The Kiev electoral district was a constituency created for the 1917 Russian Constituent Assembly election. The electoral district covered the Kiev Governorate.

The city of Kiev was a historical Black Hundred stronghold, and monarchists got some 3% of the votes in the district as a whole (a significant vote compared to the rest of the country). In the city itself the Ukrainian Socialist Bloc got 45,315 votes (25.6%), with the monarchist right-wing list getting 36,268 votes (20.5%), Bolsheviks 29,650 (16.8%), Kadets 18,165 votes (10.3%), the Jewish National Bloc 15,080 votes (8.5%), Polish 10,765 votes (6.1%), SRs 7,415 votes (4.2%), Mensheviks 6,530 votes (3.7%), Bund 1,975 votes (1.1%), Ukrainian Socialists-Federalists and Popular Socialists 1,860 votes (1%), Jewish Socialists 1,474 votes (0.8%), Poalei-Zion 966 votes (0.6%), Unity 707 votes (0.4%), Commercial-Industrial 394 votes (0.2%), Villagers' Group 170 votes (0.1%), Military Revolutionary Union 117 votes (0.1%) and 32 votes for List no. 15. In the Kiev garrison the monarchists did not amass any major share of votes, instead the Ukrainian Socialists obtained 46.1% and Bolsheviks 37%.

Results

References

Electoral districts of the Russian Constituent Assembly election, 1917
1910s elections in Ukraine